Dampelas (Dampal) is a Celebic language of Sulawesi in Indonesia. It is the main language of Dampelas District (kecamatan).

References

 

Tomini–Tolitoli languages
Languages of Sulawesi